Şanlıurfa is an electoral district of the Grand National Assembly of Turkey. It elects twelve members of parliament (deputies) to represent the province of the same name for a four-year term by the D'Hondt method, a party-list proportional representation system.

Members 
Population reviews of each electoral district are conducted before each general election, which can lead to certain districts being granted a smaller or greater number of parliamentary seats. Şanlıurfa is one of the largest in southeast Turkey, sending twelve members to Ankara.

The overwhelming majority of members are from the governing party. Şanlıurfa is a district where the pro-Kurdish Peace and Democracy Party (BDP) ran independent candidates in an attempt to overcome the 10 percent national electoral threshold. One such independent candidates was elected here in 2011 and has joined the BDP; another independent candidate was also elected.

General elections

2011

June 2015

November 2015

2018

Presidential elections

2014

References 

Electoral districts of Turkey
Politics of Şanlıurfa Province